Benaceur (sometimes written Ben Nasseur) is a town and commune in Taibet District, Touggourt Province, Algeria. According to the 2008 census it has a population of 10,330, up from the 1998 census when it had a population of 7,808. The annual population growth rate is estimated at 2.9%.

History

The area was initially settled in the mid-19th century.

Geography

Benaceur lies at an elevation of  surrounded by the palm trees of its oasis, one of many scattered oases lying between Touggourt and El Oued. Beyond the oasis are the sand dunes of the Grand Erg Oriental desert.

Transportation

Benaceur lies directly on the N16 national highway between Touggourt to the west and El Oued to the east.

Economy

The economy of the area is primarily agricultural, centered on palm farming as well as other crops such as potatoes, onions, and garlic. There are an estimated 9521 goats, 1230 sheep, 850 camels, and around 20 cows in the district.

The other main industry in Benaceur is the textile industry, mainly focused on wool and cotton.

Infrastructure

Drinking water is available to 98% of the population. However, a sewerage system for all residents has not yet been completed.

Education

There are nine elementary schools and one secondary school in the town.

Localities
The commune is composed of nine localities:

Benaceur
Benaceur El Gharbi
Khoubent
El Mezabi
Erg Debadib
Sokra
Omih El Righi
El Mor
Chouchat Chaamba

References

Neighbouring towns and cities

Communes of Ouargla Province